Rust Red September is the fifth album by English band Eyeless in Gaza, released in 1983 by record label Cherry Red. This was the first recording where Eyeless In Gaza employed overdubs, as all their previous releases were recorded in one take straight to tape.

Track listing

Reception 

Sounds wrote "With 'Rust Red September', Eyeless in Gaza have stumbled over a devastatingly simple truth, but haven't yet learnt how to harness it for their best purposes. Still, it makes (occasionally) great listening until they come up with their real masterpiece."

In an AllMusic review Ned Raggett wrote: "Rust Red September finds the group further moving away from the brusquer hooks of its earliest days to a calmer reflectiveness. If anything, the duo also achieved a light, airy pop feeling with this album".

References

External links 

 

1983 albums
Eyeless in Gaza albums
Cherry Red Records albums